Fever Dream is a solo studio album by American hip hop musician Alias. It was released on Anticon in 2011.

Critical reception
At Metacritic, which assigns a weighted average score out of 100 to reviews from mainstream critics, Fever Dream received an average score of 74% based on 9 reviews, indicating "generally favorable reviews".

Ali Maloney of The Skinny gave the album 4 stars out of 5, describing it as "a suave cocktail of rolling snares, haunting synth structures, downtempo dub and jittering slices of shoegaze – tastefully evoking the strengths of various modern masters, from FlyLo to Amon Tobin – as swirling, cut-up vocals bounce gleefully around in the distance."

Track listing

Personnel
Credits adapted from liner notes.

 Alias – production, arrangement, recording, mixing
 Michael Haggett – drums (5)
 DJ Mayonnaise – additional synthesizer (5), additional production (5), additional recording (5)
 Dax Pierson – vocals (7), additional synthesizer (7)
 Daddy Kev – mastering
 Jesselisa Moretti – cover art, design, layout

References

External links
 

2011 albums
Alias (musician) albums
Anticon albums